Henry "Hank" A. Crumpton (born 1957) is a retired Central Intelligence Agency operations officer, in his 24 year career he was appointed deputy director of the Counterterrorism Center and head the CIA's National Resources Division, which focuses on operations in the United States. He played an instrumental role in the early days of the invasion of Afghanistan, leading CTC Special Operations paramilitary forces as some of the first people with boots on the ground in pursuit of the Taliban and al-Qaeda just weeks after 9/11. Gary Schroen's seven man Northern Alliance Liaison Team (NALT) forged alliances and established camp in the mountains, while Crumpton crafted a plan for a larger incursion alongside others like Greg Vogle and Chris Wood. He went on to be appointed by President George W. Bush as Coordinator for Counterterrorism at the Department of State with the rank of Ambassador-at-large on August 2, 2005. He is an author and co-founder, co-Chairman, and co-CEO of the business intelligence firm Martin+Crumpton Group LLC.

Early life and education 
Crumpton grew up in rural Georgia. At age 16 he left home for Alabama, where he worked nights in a carpet factory while studying for his high school diploma during the day. He attended St. John's in Santa Fe, New Mexico, then transferred to the University of New Mexico where he earned a BA in political science in 1978. After graduating he traveled in Asia, the Soviet Union and Western Europe. He has a master's in international public policy from Johns Hopkins University’s School of Advanced International Studies, where he graduated with honors in 2003.

Counterterrorism career
In 1981, at the age of 23, Crumpton became the youngest trainee in his class at the CIA. He began his career at the CIA in the Africa division in Liberia in the 1980s. In 1998-99 he served as deputy chief in the FBI’s International Terrorism Operations Section, while on loan from CIA. In 1998 he investigated the al Qaeda bombings of the US embassies in Kenya and Tanzania and the 2000 attack of the USS Cole off the coast of Yemen. On the day of the 9/11 terrorist attacks, Crumpton had just taken over as CIA station chief in Canberra.<ref>Harnden, Toby, "First Casualty: The Untold Story of the CIA Mission to Avenge 9/11. Little, Brown, 2021. p. 57</ref> He was recalled to become chief of Counterterrorism Center/Special Operations (CTC/SO) in the CIA, in charge of day-to-day running of the war in Afghanistan. involved with Afghanistan until 2002 when he moved on to calmer assignments. He was the deputy director of the Counter-Terrorism Center from 1999 to 2001, and head of one of the agency's most secret divisions, the National Resources Division, from 2003 to 2005. As head of the National Resources Division he hired future CIA Director Gina Haspel as his deputy. He also was the head of the US covert response in Afghanistan to the September 11, 2001 attack, masterminding the 90-day overthrow of the Taliban. He worked for the CIA for a total of 24 years, served as State Department Coordinator for Counterterrorism with the rank of ambassador-at-large, and retired from government service in 2007.

 Post-government career 
In 2008 Crumpton founded  and is the CEO of the international advisory and business development firm Crumpton Group LLC. He is also the CEO of Crumpton Ventures, an investment group specializing in telecommunications, cyber-security, unmanned aerial systems, and more. In 2020, he and former Hill+Knowlton Strategies Chairman Jack Martin formed Martin+Crumpton Group LLC, an intelligence and public strategy consultancy, serving as co-Chairmen and co-CEOs.

Crumpton is also involved in TV and film production, creating and leading film company Aardwolf Creative LLC.  Together with his business partner, former CIA analyst Rodney Faraon, he was an executive producer for NBC's “State of Affairs” starring Katherine Heigl.

 Author 
In 2012 Crumpton published a memoir about his 24 years working for the CIA entitled, The Art of Intelligence: Lessons from a Life in the CIA's Clandestine Service. The book is currently being developed as a movie titled Aperture.He contributed two chapters to the book Transforming US Intelligence, edited by Jennifer E. Sims and former CIA operations officer Burt Gerber, published in 2005.

 Books featuring Crumpton 
He is the “Hank” featured in Gary C. Schroen’s book: First In: An Insider’s Account of How the CIA Spearheaded the War on Terror in Afghanistan and Bush at War'' by Bob Woodward. Crumpton has also been identified as the “Henry” in the September 11 Commission Report.

Awards and honors 
 The Intelligence Commendation Medal
 The George HW Bush Award for excellence in counter-terrorism
 The Sherman Kent Award
 The Donovan Award
 The Distinguished Intelligence Medal, the CIA's highest achievement award

References 

1957 births
Living people
University of New Mexico alumni
People of the Central Intelligence Agency
American spies
Paul H. Nitze School of Advanced International Studies alumni
United States Ambassadors-at-Large
Writers from Athens, Georgia
American male non-fiction writers
American memoirists